Canthidium is a genus of dung beetles in the family Scarabaeidae. There are at least 170 described species in Canthidium.

See also
 List of Canthidium species

References

Further reading

External links

 

Scarabaeidae genera